Sati Savitri  is 1957 Indian Telugu-language Hindu mythological film, based on the life of Savitri and Satyavan directed by K. B. Nagabhushanam. It stars Akkineni Nageswara Rao, S. Varalakshmi, S. V. Ranga Rao with music composed by S. V. Venkatraman. It is produced by S. Varalakshmi under the Varalakshmi Pictures banner. The film was dubbed into Tamil language with the title Sathiyavan Savithri.

Plot 
Savitri (S. Varalakshmi), the only daughter of Aswapathi Maharaja (V. Nagayya), King of Madra has been married to Satyavantha (Akkineni Nageswara Rao), son of a blind King Dyumatsena Maharaja (Dora Swamy), who lived in exile as a forest-dweller. Knowing well that Satyavantha has only a year to live after marriage, she marries him. On the day he is to die, Satyavantha is cutting the wood, he suddenly gets dizzy and lays his head in Savitri's lap. Yama Dharma Raju (S. V. Ranga Rao) himself descends on earth to claim his soul. Savitri follows him and when Yama Dharma Raju tries to convince her to go back, she persists. Impressed with her persuasive speech he grants her three boons; anything except bringing back Satyavan to life. She first asks him to restore her father-in-law's eyesight and kingdom, and then she asks for a hundred sons for her father and finally a hundred sons for herself and Satyavantha. The last wish creates an awkward situation for Yama Dharma Raja. Finally, he grants Satyavantha back his life and blesses Savitri.

Cast 
Akkineni Nageswara Rao as Satyavanthudu
S. Varalakshmi as Savitri
S. V. Ranga Rao as Yama Dharma Raju
Relangi as Sharadudu
V. Nagayya as Aswapathi Maharaju
Kanta Rao as Lord Vishnu
Suribabu as Narada Maharshi
Allu Ramalingaiah as Rama Sharma
Dr. Sivaramakrishnaiah as Vishnu Sharma
Rushyendramani as Maallavi
Suryakantham as Mallika
Suryakala as Sati Anasuya

Soundtrack 
Music composed by S. V. Venkatraman.

References

External links 

1950s Telugu-language films
Films about Savitri and Satyavan
Films scored by S. V. Venkatraman
Hindu mythological films